Elliott F. Smith (February 11, 1931 – March 1987) was an American Republican Party politician who served in the New Jersey General Assembly from 1978 to 1984, representing the 16th Legislative District.

Born in New York City, Smith grew up in Hillsborough Township, New Jersey and attended Somerville High School before studying agriculture at Rutgers University. A resident of the Belle Mead section of Hillsborough Township, Smith was a partner of Sentry Electric Company.

In 1974, Smith was appointed to fill the seat on the Hillsborough Township Committee that became vacant when Warren Nevins resigned to take a seat on the Somerset County Board of Chosen Freeholders.

References

External links

1931 births
1987 deaths
New Jersey city council members
Republican Party members of the New Jersey General Assembly
People from Hillsborough Township, New Jersey
Politicians from Somerset County, New Jersey
Somerville High School (New Jersey) alumni
Rutgers University alumni
20th-century American politicians